Arianta is a medium-sized genus of European land snails, terrestrial pulmonate gastropod mollusks in the family Helicidae.

Species of snails within this genus make and use calcareous love darts.

Species
Species within the genus Arianta include:
 Arianta aethyops (Bielz, 1851)
 Arianta arbustorum (Linnaeus, 1758)
 Arianta chamaeleon (Pfeiffer, 1868)
 Arianta frangepanii (Kormos, 1906)
 Arianta hessei (M. Kimakowicz, 1883)
 Arianta picea (Rossmässler, 1837)
 Arianta schmidtii (Rossmässler, 1836)
 Arianta stenzii (Rossmässler, 1835)
 Arianta xatartii (Farines, 1834)

References 

 Groenenberg D.S.J., Subai P. & Gittenberger E. (2016). Systematics of Ariantinae (Gastropoda, Pulmonata, Helicidae), a new approach to an old problem. Contributions to Zoology. 85(1): 37-65

External links 
 Species list
 AnimalBase
 Albers, J. C.; Martens, E. von. (1860). Die Heliceen nach natürlicher Verwandtschaft systematisch geordnet von Joh. Christ. Albers. Zweite Ausgabe. I-XVIII, 1-359. Leipzig: Engelman
 Turton, W. (1831). A manual of the land and fresh-water shells of the British Islands, arranged according to the more modern system of classification; and described from perfect specimens in the author's cabinet: with coloured plates of every species, viii + 152 + 16 pp.): Index of English names), 9 unnumbered plates. London (Longman, Rees, Orme, Brown, & Green).

Helicidae
Gastropod genera
Taxa named by William Turton